Hlohovice is a municipality and village in Rokycany District in the Plzeň Region of the Czech Republic. It has about 300 inhabitants.

Administrative parts
Villages of Hlohovičky, Mostiště and Svinná are administrative parts of Hlohovice.

References

Villages in Rokycany District